Bang Bang is a 1997 album by American indie/roots rock band Dispatch. It is their second album, following Silent Steeples.

Track listing

Credits
Chad Urmston - vocals, guitar, trombone, bass, percussion
Pete Heimbold - vocals, bass, guitar
Brad Corrigan - vocals, drums, percussion, guitar, harmonica
Geoff Burke - sax
Tom Urmston, Stu Salyer, Weej Mudge, Ben Urmston, Willy Urmston (The Belfry Chorus)

References

1997 albums
Dispatch albums